Rolly Lumbala (born January 30, 1986) is a Canadian football fullback who is currently a free agent. He was invited to training camp as a fullback for the Miami Dolphins of the National Football League. He was drafted by the BC Lions in the second round of the 2008 CFL Draft. He played college football at Idaho.

References

External links
 BC Lions bio
 Idaho Vandals bio
 
 Canadian Football League profile
 

1986 births
Living people
Sportspeople from Libreville
Canadian football people from Calgary
Gabonese players of Canadian football
Players of Canadian football from Alberta
American football fullbacks
American football tight ends
Canadian football fullbacks
Idaho Vandals football players
BC Lions players
Miami Dolphins players
21st-century Gabonese people